Belis may refer to:

Belize, a country in Central America
Bélis, a commune in Landes department, France
Beliș, a commune in Cluj County, Romania
Beliș (river), a tributary of the river Someșul Cald in Cluj County, Romania

See also
Bells (disambiguation)